Michelle Ruthven (née McKendry, born 18 June 1967) is a Canadian former alpine skier who competed in the 1988 Winter Olympics, 1992 Winter Olympics, and 1994 Winter Olympics.

In the January 1994 World Cup downhill in Garmisch-Partenkirchen, Germany, Ruthven came in third in a race where skier Ulrike Maier died.

References

1967 births
Living people
Canadian female alpine skiers
Olympic alpine skiers of Canada
Alpine skiers at the 1988 Winter Olympics
Alpine skiers at the 1992 Winter Olympics
Alpine skiers at the 1994 Winter Olympics
21st-century Canadian women
20th-century Canadian women